Shane Burgess may refer to:

Shayne Burgess, darts player
Shane Burgess, a character in Three Wishes (TV series)